St Joseph's Industrial School was an industrial school for young boys in Letterfrack, County Galway, Ireland. The school was built in 1886/7 after the designs of the architect William Hague, opened in 1887, and run by the Congregation of Christian Brothers.

St Joseph's received a lasting notoriety through revelation of physical and sexual abuse of the boys by some of the Brothers there, with evidence of sexual abuse and extreme physical punishments going back to the 1930s. According to the Commission to Inquire into Child Abuse, between the years 1940 to 1970 15 children died there while in the care of the Christian Brothers, from causes including tuberculosis.

The school was closed in 1974.

History

Origins
A wealthy Quaker couple, James and Mary Ellis, moved to Letterfrack in 1849 from the north of England, bought a large tract of land, developed it, built a residence and also a school for local children.

After the Ellises left, the school was run by Protestant Irish Church Missions to Roman Catholics. The ICM's continued up until 1882. The Catholic Archbishop of Tuam, Dr John McEvilly bought the property in 1884.

Opening
The Archbishop wrote to the Lord Lieutenant of Ireland, Earl Spencer suggesting that the property was 'admirably suited for a boys’ industrial school so sadly needed in that district'. However, the Lord Lieutenants' advisors were against the establishment of the school on the grounds that there was unlikely to be enough children requiring such an institution in the area and the existing schools were adequate for the educational needs of the area. Despite support from the Inspector of Industrial Schools, Sir Arthur Lentaigne the application was refused. The Archbishop continued to lobby the Lord Lieutenant and the school received support from the Lord Lieutenant in August 1885.

The school was initially certified for 75 boys and the Archbishop entered into negotiations with the Christian Brothers. The Christian Brothers agreed and after building work added to the property, the schools opened on 12 October 1887.

Running of school
A revised certificate doubling the number of boys the school could care for was issued in April 1889 and in November 1912, the accommodation limit was increased to 190.

The physical isolation of Letterfrack and the distances from their families increased the isolation of boys there - the surrounding area didn't supply the number of children required and many were from Dublin and Leinster.

The isolation was also a factor in institutionalisation and the fact that those who abused could remain undetected for so long. In total 2,819 boys went through Letterfrack between 1887 and 1974.

The remote location of the school was a factor in its closing.

Until 1954, there were three classes of boy at Letterfrack:
Those who were homeless, without proper guardianship, destitute, in breach of the School Attendance Act or guilty of criminal offences.
Those sent by the Local Authorities pursuant to the Public Assistance Act 1939.
Those who were voluntarily admitted by parents or guardians.

Carriglea pupils sent to Letterfrack
In 1954 the Christian Brothers decided to close one of their schools and chose Carriglea Park in Dún Laoghaire. They separated out 'juvenile delinquents' and sent them to Letterfrack industrial school.

Conclusions of the Ryan Report

Physical abuse

The report concluded that corporal punishment in Letterfrack was "severe, excessive and pervasive, and created a climate of fear", that it "was the primary method of control" and that unavoidable because "it was frequently capricious, unfair and inconsistent". There was no punishment book kept and the Department of Education was found to be at fault for not ensuring that one was maintained.

Sexual abuse

Sexual abuse "by Brothers was a chronic problem in Letterfrack" and that those members of the order who served there "included firstly those who had previously been guilty of sexual abuse of boys, secondly those whose abuse was discovered while they worked in that institution and, thirdly some who were subsequently revealed to have abused boys".

The Christian Brothers "did not properly investigate allegations of sexual abuse of boys by Brothers" and "knew that Brothers who sexually abused boys were a continuing danger". Sending known abusers to any industrial school was "an act of reckless disregard" especially "one as remote and isolated as Letterfrack". The handling of members of the order who committed abuse suggested "a policy of protecting the Brothers, the Community and the Congregation at the expense of the victims".

Abuse by peers was "an element of the bullying and intimidation that were prevalent in Letterfrack and the Brothers failed to recognise it as a persistent problem". Lack of understanding on behalf of the order of the nature of abuse committed by peers combined with fear of punishment meant that some victims didn't report such abuse at the time.

Neglect
Boys at Letterfrack "were unprotected in a hostile environment isolated from their families", they "left Letterfrack with little education and no adequate training". They needed extra support to bring them up to standard "but instead they got poor teachers and bad conditions".

Former residents
Thomas Dempsey - grandfather of Damien Dempsey. He spent four years in the institution, which he compared to Auschwitz.
Mannix Flynn - playwright, author, artist, actor.
Peter Tyrrell - he told Owen Sheehy-Skeffington about the abuse perpetrated in Letterfrack industrial school and wrote a book about Letterfrack that was published posthumously. Tyrell committed suicide in London by setting fire to himself.

References

Boys' schools in the Republic of Ireland
Education in County Galway
History of County Galway
Youth detention centers
Industrial schools in the Republic of Ireland
Defunct schools in the Republic of Ireland
Educational institutions disestablished in 1974
Defunct Catholic schools in Ireland
Violence against men in Europe